Albany is a home rule-class city in Clinton County, Kentucky, in the United States. The population was 2,033 at the 2010 census. It is the county seat of Clinton County.

History
The community of Albany grew up around a tavern established by Benjamin Dowell in the early 19th century. In 1837, residents voted to make the location the seat of county government. It is generally accepted that the town, formally incorporated on January 27, 1838, was named after Albany, New York, but a local legend holds that, during the vote to determine the location of the county seat, patrons of Dowell's tavern shouted "All for Benny!", then "all Benny," which led to the town being called Albany.

During the Civil War, Albany was attacked by Confederate forces, and many buildings, including the courthouse, were burned. A marker in the courthouse square notes that Clinton was the native county of Civil War terrorist Champ Ferguson, hanged after the war for atrocities.

Geography
Albany is located in south-central Clinton County at  (36.693280, -85.135286).

Climate
The climate in this area is characterized by hot, humid summers and generally mild to cool winters.  According to the Köppen Climate Classification system, Albany has a humid subtropical climate, abbreviated "Cfa" on climate maps.

Demographics

As of the census of 2000, there were 2,220 people, 1,018 households, and 561 families residing in the city. The racial makeup of the city was 98.38% White, 0.05% African American, 0.14% Native American, 0.05% Asian, 0.50% Pacific Islander, 0.18% from other races, and 0.72% from two or more races. Hispanic or Latino of any race were 3.11% of the population.

There were 1,018 households, out of which 25.1% had children under the age of 18 living with them, 37.5% were married couples living together, 14.5% had a female householder with no husband present, and 44.8% were non-families. 41.6% of all households were made up of individuals, and 19.3% had someone living alone who was 65 years of age or older. The average household size was 2.12 and the average family size was 2.86.

In the city, the population was spread out, with 21.5% under the age of 18, 9.9% from 18 to 24, 24.4% from 25 to 44, 24.8% from 45 to 64, and 19.4% who were 65 years of age or older. The median age was 40 years. For every 100 females, there were 80.2 males. For every 100 females age 18 and over, there were 77.0 males.

The median income for a household in the city was $14,558, and the median income for a family was $22,652. Males had a median income of $21,389 versus $16,685 for females. The per capita income for the city was $12,919. About 28.9% of families and 35.9% of the population were below the poverty line, including 49.8% of those under age 18 and 36.5% of those age 65 or over.

Education

Schools
All schools in the city are operated by the Clinton County School District
 Early Childhood Center
 Albany Elementary School
 Clinton County Middle School
 Clinton County High School

Libraries
Albany has a lending library, the Clinton County Public Library.

Notable people

 Thomas Bramlette, Union Democratic governor of Kentucky, 1863–1867
 Garlin Murl Conner, a soldier in the United States  Army during the Second World War. Assigned to the 3rd Infantry Division and served in North Africa and Europe; he may have been "the greatest soldier of our time."
 Sam C. Ford, the 12th governor of Montana
 Jeff Hoover, Speaker of the House, Kentucky House of Representatives.
 Preston H. Leslie, Democratic governor of Kentucky and territorial governor of Montana

References

Further reading

External links
 Albany/Clinton County visitors' guide

County seats in Kentucky
Populated places established in 1838
Cities in Clinton County, Kentucky
1838 establishments in Kentucky
Cities in Kentucky